Sayed Mohmood Hasamuddeen Al-Gailani was elected to represent Ghazni Province in Afghanistan's Wolesi Jirga, the lower house of its National Legislature, in 2005. He is from the Pashtun ethnic group. He is a grandson of Pir Gailani, a prominent Sufi, and leader of an Afghan political party.

References

Politicians of Ghazni Province
Living people
Members of the House of the People (Afghanistan)
Year of birth missing (living people)